Yves Deruyter (born May 4, 1970) is a Belgian DJ and artist famous for his work on Bonzai Records.

Career
Yves Deruyter started his DJ career in 1985 and has played in Belgian clubs such as Globe, Barocci, Cherrymoon, Extreme, Carat, BBC, and La Rocca. In 1991, like so many DJs, he also started an artist career. Since then he has been signed to Bonzai Records. His first single "Animals" became a big club hit in Belgium. At this stage people started watching artists like Yves Deruyter for playing on big raves such as Mayday, Energy, Love Parade, Street Parade, Nature One, Trance Energy, Mystery Land, Inner City, Sensation Black, Dance Valley, Groundzero, Frequence, Decibel Outdoor, Defqon 1, Gatecrasher, I love Techno, Antwerp is Burning, City Parade, and Tomorrowland.

With his second single he made a big jump into the German market. "Rave City" became a big success with more than 50,000 records sold. The follow-up "Calling Earth" was again a success with 70,000 singles sold. All this was the start of a successful story. "A Story About House" was to be the next Cherrymoon Trax single, but due to problems with the club it was changed into a new Yves Deruyter single. Unfortunately this single did not achieve any breakthroughs. Nevertheless, his follow-up single, "The Rebel," was immediately signed for the world. "The Rebel" was an instant hit and the international breakthrough for Yves Deruyter. This single was also signalled the arrival of his first album, D-Album, containing all his singles from past and future. During this period he also started the musical outlet of the Cherrymoon where he was playing. So far he made four Cherrymoon Trax singles of which the first, "The House of House," and the last single, "In My Electric House," were likewise successful in Germany.

All this in combination with the first 3D black and white video made by Frank Dewulf who became an important artist with his B-side releases. Yves Deruyter's vision in his music is to make music for the people. It is important to him that people have fun while they're listening/dancing to his music. In the past he used to work with Frederico Santini, but the majority for the years to come his counterpart would be hit producer Mike "M.I.K.E. Push" Dierickx (Push, The Blackmaster, Moon Project, etc.) who was one of the most important producers at Bonzai Records. The single "Rhythmic Bazz" was released in June 2001. This single was taken from the album 2001 as well as Back to Earth. The follow-up single was "Music-Nonstop", which also got a remix-package with remixes from e.g. Ton TB (Three Drives).

His most recent release was "Spiritual Feeling/Y.D.O.T.", which did pretty well all over Europe. His new single will be a re-release of "Spiritual Feeling", which will also include a "Dolphin remix". He made this remix together with L-Vee (Airwave).

Producing
He started his artist-career in 1992, when he signed a contract with Bonzai Records and released his first single, 'Animals'. His second single, 'Rave City', gave him a place in the house-classics (especially in Germany) and sold over 50,000 copies. His third single, 'Calling Earth', did even better with over 70,000 copies sold.

The single that did best, "The Rebel", also led to his first album titled D-Album.

He also released music under the alias Cherrymoon, after the club he played in.

Discography

Album
Source
 1998 : Calling Earth Bonzai
 1999 : D-Album Dmdorbit
 2001 : Feel Free S&M S
 2004 : Yves Deruyter 2001 INDEPENDANCE
 2005 : Timeless Trance ZYX Music
 2007 : D-Classics Bongiovanni

Single
Source

 1994 : Rave City Streetheat
 1995 : Outsiders
 1996 : Outsider: Remix Logic Records
 1996 : Move Your Body Casseopaya
 1997 : Calling Earth Netherlands Total Recall
 1997 : The Rebel Bonzai Bonzai
 1999 : Feel Free Belgium 12" Single Bonzai
 1999 : Feel Free UK 12" Single Bonzai
 1999 : Factory/Bass Mekaniks Dmdbonzai
 2000 : Factor Y Dmdbonzai
 2000 : Factor Y
 2000 : To the Rhythm CD/12" Orbit
 2000 : Back to Earth Polygram
 2001 : [[Feel Fine US CD/12']] Star Sixty Nine Records 2001 : Rhythmic Bazz 2002 : Music Non Stop
 2004 : On the Move Phobos / ZYX Music 2005 : Born Slippy ZYX Music 2005 : Calling Earth Germany Phobos / ZYX Music 2005 : Calling Earth DMDTR 2005 : Infinity ZYX Music Remix EP Bonzai''

References

External links
 Official site

Living people
Club DJs
Belgian DJs
Belgian trance musicians
Musicians from Antwerp
1970 births
Electronic dance music DJs